The 2019–20 season was Al-Shorta's 46th season in the Iraqi Premier League, having featured in all 45 previous editions of the competition. Al-Shorta participated in five competitions: the Iraqi Premier League (as defending champions), the Iraq FA Cup, the Iraqi Super Cup, the AFC Champions League and the Arab Club Champions Cup.

Al-Shorta won the Iraqi Super Cup for the first time in their history, beating Al-Zawraa on penalties after a 1–1 draw. They also reached the quarter-finals of the Arab Club Champions Cup, their best performance at the tournament since they were crowned champions in the 1981–82 season. Al-Shorta only played a total of six League matches and one FA Cup match in the season as both competitions were postponed for several months due to the 2019–2020 Iraqi protests and later cancelled due to the COVID-19 pandemic. The pandemic also led to their remaining four AFC Champions League group stage matches being postponed to the 2020–21 campaign.

Squad
Numbers in parenthesis denote appearances as substitute.

Personnel

Technical staff

Management

Kit
Supplier: Givova

Transfers

In

Out

Competitions

Iraqi Super Cup

Iraqi Premier League

Original season

Restarted season

Iraq FA Cup

AFC Champions League

Al-Shorta played two 2020 AFC Champions League matches in the 2019–20 season before their remaining matches in the competition were postponed to the following campaign due to the COVID-19 pandemic.

Group stage

Arab Club Champions Cup

Round of 32

Round of 16

Quarter-finals

References

External links
Al-Shorta website
Al-Shorta TV
Team info at goalzz.com

Al-Shorta SC seasons